Webster is a city located in Sumter County, Florida, United States. As of the 2020 census, the city had a total population of 778. According to the U.S. Census Bureau's 2018 estimates, the town had a population of 1,114. The ZIP Code for this city is 33597, which is shared by Oak Grove, St. Catherine, Croom-a-Coochee, Tarrytown, Linden and part of Mabel.

Geography 

Webster is located at 28°36'47" North, 82°3'15" West (28.613142, –82.054043).

Demographics 

As of the census of 2000, there were 805 people, 294 households, and 209 families residing in the city. The racial makeup of the city was 56.15% White, 34.53% African American, 0.87% Native American, 0.37% Asian, 0.12% Pacific Islander, 4.60% from other races, and 3.35% from two or more races.  15.16% of the population were Hispanic or Latino of any race.

There were 294 households, out of which 36.1% had children under the age of 18 living with them, 38.8% were married couples living together, 26.2% had a female householder with no husband present, and 28.9% were non-families. 25.5% of all households were made up of individuals, and 10.5% had someone living alone who was 65 years of age or older.  The average household size was 2.70 and the average family size was 3.19.

In the city, the population was spread out, with 31.3% under the age of 18, 8.3% from 18 to 24, 25.5% from 25 to 44, 20.5% from 45 to 64, and 14.4% who were 65 years of age or older.  The median age was 35 years.  For every 100 females, there were 87.6 males.  For every 100 females age 18 and over, there were 81.3 males.

The median income for a household in the city was $18,000, and the median income for a family was $25,000. Males had a median income of $28,523 versus $22,361 for females. The per capita income for the city was $9,823.  30.6% of the population and 28.7% of families were below the poverty line.  Out of the total population, 29.8% of those under the age of 18 and 21.8% of those 65 and older were living below the poverty line.

Notable people

 Keanu Neal, Current NFL player for Tampa Bay Buccaneers

See also

 List of cities in Florida

References

External links

 Webster History (Sumter Today)

Cities in Sumter County, Florida
Cities in Florida